Handwrought, also known as Thomas Marshall House, is a historic home located at Concordville, Delaware County, Pennsylvania. It was built in 1805, and is a two- to three-story Eastern Pennsylvania Bank House.  It is built of random fieldstone and has two entrances. Heat, electronic, and water were installed in the house after 1947.

It was added to the National Register of Historic Places in 1978.

References

Houses on the National Register of Historic Places in Pennsylvania
Houses completed in 1805
Houses in Delaware County, Pennsylvania
1805 establishments in Pennsylvania
National Register of Historic Places in Delaware County, Pennsylvania